Sidney Preston Dones (1888 – August 2, 1947) was an American businessman involved in real estate, insurance, legal services, and the film business.

He was born in Marshall, Texas. He studied at LaSalle Extension University School of Law. He  married Lavinia H. Relerford and then Bessie Williams.

In 1914, Dones opened an office on Central Avenue in Los Angeles next to the California Eagle newspaper. He ran for political office as an Independent and as a Progressive.

He was at the vanguard of African Americans involved in Los Angeles real estate. In 1927 he was jailed for usury.

He joined with other prominent investors to buy and develop a tract of land in Val Verde, California for African Americans.

Filmography
Injustice (1919)
Reformation (1919)
The Ten Thousand Dollar Trail (1921).

References

1947 deaths
1888 births